Alice de Lencquesaing (born 11 August 1991) is a French actress who appeared in Mia Hansen-Løve's 2009 film Father of My Children with her father Louis-Do de Lencquesaing. Her mother is cinematographer Caroline Champetier. She was also in the film Summer Hours.

Filmography

Theatre

References

External links 

 

1991 births
Living people
French film actresses
Actresses from Paris
French stage actresses
21st-century French actresses